Grubbs catalysts are a series of transition metal carbene complexes used as catalysts for olefin metathesis. They are named after Robert H. Grubbs, the chemist who supervised their synthesis. Several generations of the catalyst have been developed. Grubbs catalysts tolerate many functional groups in the alkene substrates, are air-tolerant, and are compatible with a wide range of solvents. For these reasons, Grubbs catalysts have become popular in synthetic organic chemistry. Grubbs, together with Richard R. Schrock and Yves Chauvin, won the Nobel Prize in Chemistry in recognition of their contributions to the development of olefin metathesis.

First-generation catalyst
In the 1960s, ruthenium trichloride was found to catalyze olefin metathesis.  Processes were commercialized based on these discoveries. These ill-defined but highly active homogeneous catalysts remain in industrial use. The first well-defined ruthenium catalyst was reported in 1992. It was prepared from RuCl2(PPh3)4 and diphenylcyclopropene.

This initial ruthenium catalyst was followed in 1995 by what is now known as the first-generation Grubbs catalyst. It is synthesized from RuCl2(PPh3)3, phenyldiazomethane, and tricyclohexylphosphine in a one-pot synthesis.

The first-generation Grubbs catalyst was the first well-defined Ru-based catalyst. It is also important as a precursor to all other Grubbs-type catalysts.

Second-generation catalyst
The second-generation catalyst has the same uses in organic synthesis as the first generation catalyst, but generally with higher activity. This catalyst is stable toward moisture and air, thus is easier to handle in the lab.

Shortly before the discovery of the second-generation Grubbs catalyst, a very similar catalyst based on an unsaturated N-heterocyclic carbene (1,3-bis(2,4,6-trimethylphenyl)imidazole) was reported independently by Nolan and Grubbs in March 1999, and by Fürstner in June of the same year. Shortly thereafter, in August 1999, Grubbs reported the second-generation catalyst, based on a saturated N-heterocyclic carbene (1,3-bis(2,4,6-trimethylphenyl)dihydroimidazole):

In both the saturated and unsaturated cases a phosphine ligand is replaced with an N-heterocyclic carbene (NHC), which is characteristic of all second-generation-type catalysts.

Both the first- and second-generation catalysts are commercially available, along with many derivatives of the second-generation catalyst.

Hoveyda–Grubbs catalysts 
In the Hoveyda–Grubbs catalysts, the benzylidene ligands have a chelating ortho-isopropoxy group attached to the benzene rings. The ortho-isopropoxybenzylidene moiety is sometimes referred to as a Hoveyda chelate. The chelating oxygen atom replaces a phosphine ligand, which in the case of the 2nd generation catalyst, gives a completely phosphine-free structure. The 1st generation Hoveyda–Grubbs catalyst was reported in 1999 by Amir H. Hoveyda's group, and in the following year, the second-generation Hoveyda–Grubbs catalyst was described in nearly simultaneous publications by the Blechert and Hoveyda laboratories. Siegfried Blechert's name is not commonly included in the eponymous catalyst name. The Hoveyda–Grubbs catalysts, while more expensive and slower to initiate than the Grubbs catalyst from which they are derived, are popular because of their improved stability. By changing the steric and electronic properties of the chelate, the initiation rate of the catalyst can be modulated, such as in the Zhan catalysts. Hoveyda–Grubbs catalysts are easily formed from the corresponding Grubbs catalyst by the addition of the chelating ligand and the use of a phosphine scavenger like copper(I) chloride:

The second-generation Hoveyda–Grubbs catalysts can also be prepared from the 1st generation Hoveyda–Grubbs catalyst by the addition of the NHC:

In one study a water-soluble Grubbs catalyst is prepared by attaching a polyethylene glycol chain to the imidazolidine group. This catalyst is used in the ring-closing metathesis reaction in water of a diene carrying an ammonium salt group making it water-soluble as well.

Third-generation Grubbs catalyst (fast-initiating catalysts) 
The rate of the Grubbs catalyst can be altered by replacing the phosphine ligand with more labile pyridine ligands. By using 3-bromopyridine the initiation rate is increased more than a millionfold. Both pyridine and 3-bromopyridine are commonly used, with the bromo- version 4.8 times more labile resulting in even faster rates. The catalyst is traditionally isolated as a two pyridine complex, however one pyridine is lost upon dissolving and reversibly inhibits the ruthenium center throughout any chemical reaction. 

The principal application of the fast-initiating catalysts is as initiators for ring opening metathesis polymerisation (ROMP). Because of their usefulness in ROMP these catalysts are sometimes referred to as the 3rd generation Grubbs catalysts. The high ratio of the rate of initiation to the rate of propagation makes these catalysts useful in living polymerization, yielding polymers with low polydispersity.

Applications 
Grubbs catalysts are of interest for olefin metathesis. It is mainly applied to fine chemical synthesis.  Large-scale commercial applications of olefin metathesis almost always employ heterogeneous catalysts or ill-defined systems based on ruthenium trichloride.

References

Organoruthenium compounds
Catalysts
Phosphine complexes
Chloro complexes
D
Substances discovered in the 1990s
Ruthenium(II) compounds
Cyclohexyl compounds